The 2023 J.League Cup, known as the 2023 J.League YBC Levain Cup for sponsorship reasons, is the 31st edition of J.League Cup, a Japanese association football cup competition. Opposed to the previous editions, the competition will not use the away goals rule. No byes awarded for the knockout stage and thus no knockout round playoffs.

Sanfrecce Hiroshima are the defending champions, having beaten Cerezo Osaka 2–1 in the final in 2022 to win their first J.League Cup title.

Format 
All 18 teams in the 2023 J1 League participate as well as the top two relegated teams from the 2022 season. Different from the previous editions, no teams are awarded bye or a direct qualification for the knockout stage. The change was made due to AFC Champions League's calendar shift, as it adopts the spring-autumn season format from 2023 and got rid of the year-round format, thus having the 2023–24 group stage played from September 2023.

Twenty teams play in the group stage, being divided into five groups of four teams, allocated in each group by their finish on the 2022 J1 and J2 Leagues. Each group winner and the three best-placed runners-up will qualify to the quarter-finals.

This is the last season to feature a group stage in the competition. From 2024, it will be held as a single knockout competition like the EFL Cup and will see all clubs from the season's J1, J2, and J3 Leagues participate, thus including the clubs from all J.League divisions for the first time since 2001.

Qualified teams

Schedule 
The schedule was confirmed alongside with the holding method of the competition on 20 December 2022.

Group stage
Each group has its matches played on a home-and-away round-robin basis. Each match lasts 90 minutes. Each team plays six times, twice against each opponent at home and away.

Tiebreakers
In the group stage, teams in a group are ranked by points (3 points for a win, 1 point for a draw, 0 points for a loss). If the points are tied, the following tiebreakers are applied accordingly:

 Points in head-to-head matches among tied teams;
 Goal difference in head-to-head matches among tied teams;
 Goals scored in head-to-head matches among tied teams;

If more than two teams are tied, and applying all head-to-head criteria above remains a part of teams still tied, reapply the criteria above only for the tied teams.
 Goal difference in all group matches;
 Goals scored in all group matches;
 Penalty shoot-out if only two teams are tied and they meet in the last round of the group;
 Fewer disciplinary points;
 Drawing of lots.

Group A

Group B

Group C

Group D

Group E

Ranking of runners-up
The three best runners-up from the five groups advance to the knockout stage along with the five group winners.

Knockout stage
In the knockout stage, which starts with the quarter-finals, the matches will be played in two legs, except for the final. The aggregate winners of each tie will qualify for the next round. If in the second leg of either the quarter-final or semi-final the aggregate score is tied, extra-time will be played. If the draw stands, penalty shoot-outs will be played to determine the tie winners. From this season on, the away goals rule will not be applied under any circumstances throughout the entire competition.

Top scorers

References

External links 
Official website (in Japanese)

J.League Cup
2023 in Japanese football
J
J